Thomas 'Tommy' Crossan Press is a South African international lawn bowler.

Bowls career
He competed in the first World Bowls Championship in Kyeemagh, New South Wales, Australia in 1966  and won a silver medal in the pairs with Norman Snowy Walker at the event.

He won the 1950 rinks at the National Championships, bowling for the Pretoria Bowls Club.

References

Possibly living people
South African male bowls players